Abdullah Karmil (born 22 January 1988) is a Turkish footballer who plays as a defender for Düzcespor. He made his Süper Lig debut on 23 February 2013.

References

External links
 Abdullah Karmil at TFF.org
 
 

1988 births
Living people
Footballers from Istanbul
Turkish footballers
Turkey under-21 international footballers
Turkey youth international footballers
1461 Trabzon footballers
Çorumspor footballers
Trabzonspor footballers
Ankaraspor footballers
Adanaspor footballers
Süper Lig players
Association football defenders
TFF First League players